Nebojša Joksimović may refer to:

 Nebojša Joksimović (footballer) (born 1981), Serbian football player
 Nebojša Joksimović (basketball) (born 1981), Slovenian basketball player